The Early Stories: 1953–1975, published in 2003 by Knopf, is a John Updike book collecting much of his short stories written from the beginning of his writing career, when he was just 21, until 1975. Only four stories published in this entire time period have been omitted from this collection by John Updike himself: "Intercession" (collected in The Same Door), and "The Pro", "One of My Generation", and "God Speaks" (collected in Museums and Women and Other Stories). The majority of the stories were originally published in The New Yorker magazine. In 2004, the book received the PEN/Faulkner Award for Fiction.

Stories collected
The stories are not arranged chronologically but rather by theme into eight sections: "Olinger Stories" (from "You'll Never Know, Dear, How Much I Love You" to "In Football Season", same as the 1964 collection Olinger Stories), "Out in the World" (from "The Lucid Eye in Silver Town" to "At a Bar in Charlotte Amalie"), "Married Life" (from "Toward Evening" to "Nakedness"), "Family Life" (from "The Family Meadow" to "Daughter, Last Glimpses of"), "The Two Iseults" (from "Solitaire" to " I Will Not Let Thee Go, Except Thou Bless Me"), "Tarbox Tales" (from "The Indian" to "Eclipse"), "Far Out" (from "Archangel" to "The Sea's Green Sameness"), and "The Single Life" (from "The Bulgarian Poetess" to "Love Song, for a Moog Synthesizer").

Notes
1. Stories later collected in Too Far to Go (1979), which was later reprinted in 2009 as The Maples Stories.
2. Despite being published in 1976, this story was written a year earlier.

References

Short story collections by John Updike
2003 short story collections
Works originally published in The New Yorker
PEN/Faulkner Award for Fiction-winning works